Lloyd Harper (born 8 March 1949) is a Guyanese cricketer. He played in one List A and six first-class matches for Guyana from 1976 to 1982.

See also
 List of Guyanese representative cricketers

References

External links
 

1949 births
Living people
Guyanese cricketers
Guyana cricketers
Sportspeople from Georgetown, Guyana